Three O'Clock in the Morning is a 1923 American silent drama film directed by Kenneth S. Webb and starring Constance Binney, Edmund Breese, and Richard Thorpe. It is now considered to be a lost film.

Plot
As described in a film magazine review, Elizabeth Winthrop becomes fascinated with cabaret life and makes friends who are objectionable to her parents. She resents her father's treatment of her friends and leaves home. She seeks work as a chorus girl in New York City and is aided by Hugo von Strohm, who unknown to her pays for her salary at the cabaret. Clayton Webster, her fiancé, objects to her work so she returns his engagement ring. Hugo invites her to a roadhouse and tries to force his attentions on her. On the way to the roadhouse, she is recognized by her mother and is rescued. Clayton is bound to leave by steamship to South America. Elizabeth arrives at the pier just as the ship is pulling away and wigwags that she loves him. He jumps overboard and swims ashore.

Cast
 Constance Binney as Elizabeth Winthrop
 Edmund Breese as Mr. Winthrop
 Richard Thorpe as Clayton Webster
 Mary Carr as 	Mrs. Winthrop
 William Bailey as Hugo von Strohm 
 Edna May Oliver as Hetty
 Russell Griffin as Mickey Flynn

References

Bibliography
 Connelly, Robert B. The Silents: Silent Feature Films, 1910-36, Volume 40, Issue 2. December Press, 1998.
 Munden, Kenneth White. The American Film Institute Catalog of Motion Pictures Produced in the United States, Part 1. University of California Press, 1997.

External links

Still at silenthollywood.com

1923 films
1923 drama films
1923 lost films
1920s English-language films
American silent feature films
Silent American drama films
Films directed by Kenneth Webb
American black-and-white films
Films set in New York City
Flappers
1920s American films
English-language drama films